Cilovdarlı (also, Dzhilovdarly) is a village and municipality in the Tovuz Rayon of Azerbaijan.  It has a population of 1,237.

References 

Populated places in Tovuz District